Elections to the Ajmer Legislative Assembly were held on 27 March 1952. 134 candidates competed for the 30 seats in the Assembly. This was the final election for the Ajmer Legislative Assembly: on 1 November 1956, under the provisions of the States Reorganisation Act, 1956, the Ajmer State was abolished and its constituencies were merged into Rajasthan.

Constituencies

The Ajmer Legislative Assembly consisted of 30 seats distributed in six two-member constituencies; Ajmer-I (South West), Ajmer-II (East), Jethana, Nasirabad, Kekri and Masuda and eighteen single-member constituencies. None of these seats were under reserved category for Scheduled Castes and Scheduled Tribes. Total 134 candidates contested for these 30 seats. Maximum number of candidates were 13 from Ajmer-I (South West) and Ajmer-II (East), while Bhinai had only 2 contestants, minimum of all the constituencies.

Results

!colspan=8|
|- style="background-color:#E9E9E9; text-align:center;"
! class="unsortable" |
! Political Party !! Flag !! Seats  Contested !! Won !! % of  Seats !! Votes !! Vote %
|- style="background: #90EE90;"
| 
| style="text-align:left;" |Indian National Congress
| 
| 30 || 20 || 66.67 || 1,04,411 || 44.47
|-
| 
| style="text-align:left;" |Bharatiya Jana Sangh
|
| 15 || 3 || 10.00 || 28,057 || 11.95
|-
| 
| style="text-align:left;" |Pursharathi Panchayat
|
| 6 || 3 || 10.00 || 15,781 || 7.72
|-
| 
| style="text-align:left;" |Communist Party of India
| 
| 2 || 0 ||  || 3,494 || 1.49
|-
| 
| style="text-align:left;" |Socialist Party (India)
|
| 2 || 0 || ||  1,055 || 0.45
|-
| 
|
| 79 || 4 || 13.33 || 81,990 || 34.92
|- class="unsortable" style="background-color:#E9E9E9"
! colspan = 3| Total Seats
! 30 !! style="text-align:center;" |Voters !! 4,62,810 !! style="text-align:center;" |Turnout !! 2,34,788 (50.73%)
|}

Elected members

By-elections 
In September 1953 a by-election was held for the Bhinai seat. In the original election, the Bhinai seat had been won by Kalyan Singh of the Bharatiya Jan Sangh, who defeated the Indian National Congress candidate Madan Singh with 3,164 votes (51.58%) against 2,970 (48.42%). However, the election in Bhinai was declared void as nomination papers had been improperly rejected and a by-election was called. Three candidates contested the by-election; Kalyan Singh of BJS, Chiman Singh of INC and independent candidate Misri Lal Chitlangia. Kalyan Singh retained the seat with 3,662 votes (65.3%). The Congress candidate got 1,635 votes (29.2%) and Chitalngia got 310 votes (5.5%).

See also

 1951–52 elections in India
 Ajmer State
 1951 Rajasthan Legislative Assembly election
 1957 Rajasthan Legislative Assembly election

References

Ajmer
Ajmer Legislative Assembly
Ajmer district
March 1952 events in Asia
1950s in Ajmer